The 1928 Dartmouth Indians football team was an American football team that represented Dartmouth College as an independent during the 1928 college football season. In their sixth and final season under head coach Jesse Hawley, the Indians compiled a 5–4 record. Richard Black was the team captain.

Al Marsters was the team's leading scorer, with 67 points, from 11 touchdowns and one kicked extra point.

Dartmouth played its home games at Memorial Field on the college campus in Hanover, New Hampshire.

Schedule

References

Dartmouth
Dartmouth Big Green football seasons
Dartmouth Indians football